Karnataka State Road Transport Corporation, abbreviated and better known as KSRTC is a state-owned public road transport company in the Indian state of Karnataka.

List of existing Government Bus stations in Karnataka by Transport Corporation

KSRTC 

Source:

KKRTC 

Source:

NWKRTC

BMTC 

Source:

See also
 List of bus depots in Karnataka
 Karnataka State Road Transport Corporation (KSRTC)
 Bengaluru Metropolitan Transport Corporation (BMTC)
 North Western Karnataka Road Transport Corporation (NWKRTC)
 Kalyana Karnataka Road Transport Corporation (KKRTC)

References

External links
 KSRTC Official Website
 

 
Transport in Bangalore
Bus transport in Karnataka
Karnataka